Alexander Josiah Webbe (16 January 1855 – 19 February 1941) was a cricketer who played for Oxford University and Middlesex. He also played one Test match for England.

After being schooled at Harrow School, he went on to Trinity College, Oxford, where he got a Blue in his first year. He was twice captain of the university side. Whilst still at Oxford, Webbe played for the Gentlemen at Lord's and made 65 out of 203 in the opening stand, which he shared with WG Grace.

Webbe first played for Middlesex in his first year at University, aged only 20. In 1878–79 he was one of the amateurs to tour Australia with Lord Harris, and it was on this tour that he played in his one and only Test, scoring only 4 and 0.

Webbe was appointed captain of Middlesex in 1885, a post he held until 1898. His best season as a batsman was his third as captain, when in 1887 he scored 1,244 runs at an average of 47 and made 243 not out against Yorkshire.

After he retired as a cricketer, he was secretary of Middlesex from 1900 to 1922 and President of Middlesex from 1923 to 1936. From 1886 until 1909 he was a member of the committee of the Marylebone Cricket Club.

In 1884, Webbe became a Christian through Dwight L. Moody's preaching, after C. T. Studd invited him to attend Moody's campaign meeting.

References

External links

1855 births
1941 deaths
People educated at Harrow School
Alumni of Trinity College, Oxford
Cricketers from Greater London
England Test cricketers
English cricketers
Middlesex cricket captains
Oxford University cricketers
Presidents of Middlesex County Cricket Club
Secretaries of Middlesex County Cricket Club
I Zingari cricketers
Gentlemen of the South cricketers
Gentlemen cricketers
Marylebone Cricket Club cricketers
North v South cricketers
Orleans Club cricketers
Gentlemen of England cricketers
C. I. Thornton's XI cricketers
A. J. Webbe's XI cricketers
Old Oxonians cricketers
A. W. Ridley's XI cricketers
Middlesex cricketers
Gentlemen of Marylebone Cricket Club cricketers